Hammarbya paludosa (or Malaxis paludosa) is a small orchid commonly known as bog orchid, bog adder's-mouth or bog adder's-mouth orchid. It grows in bogs in temperate and subarctic regions of the Northern Hemisphere.

Taxonomy 
It was originally named Ophrys paludosa by Carl Linnaeus. The name paludosa refers to the boggy ground where it grows. In 1891, Otto Kuntze moved it to a new genus of its own called Hammarbya, named after Hammarby, Linnaeus’s summer residence. Alternatively it is placed in the genus Malaxis.

Description 
It is a small, inconspicuous orchid which can reach 15 cm in height but usually grows to between 4 and 8 cm. The stem is yellow-green, has three to five corners and grows from a small pseudobulb wrapped in two to five reduced leaves. There are two, three or sometimes four basal leaves. These are oval to oblong, fleshy and pale green or yellow-green. The edges and tips curve inwards. There are one to three small, scale-like leaves higher up the stem. The leaves may have small bulblet-like reproductive structures on their margins.

The flowers grow in a spike-like raceme that is 1.5–6 cm long and bears up to 25 flowers. They are small and greenish, about 2 mm wide and 4 mm tall. They have three sepals and three petals, one of which is modified to form a lip. There is one dorsal sepal pointing downwards and two lateral sepals pointing up. The two normal petals are small, narrow and strap-shaped and curve back around the sepals. The short, triangular lip is dark green with paler stripes and points upwards and forwards. The flowers have a sweet, cucumber-like scent.

In the majority of orchids, the flowers are resupinate, twisting 180° during development so that the lip points downwards. In Hammarbya paludosa, the flowers twist a further 180° so that the lip once more points upwards. Charles Darwin noted this feature in his 1862 book Fertilisation of Orchids.

Distribution and habitat 
Hammarbya paludosa has a wide range around the Northern Hemisphere. In Europe it occurs north to 69° in Scandinavia and south to the Italian Alps, Balkans and Romania. It occurs locally across southern Siberia east to Sakhalin and Japan. In North America, it is found from Alaska east to Ontario and south to Minnesota. (Codes)  In the British Isles it is found widely but very locally with the largest numbers in north-west Scotland. It has disappeared from much of England but is more frequent in the New Forest.

It grows in bogs near streams and ditches or where there is a slow flow of water over the surface. It prefers acidic conditions but sometimes grows in more alkaline habitats. It most often grows in areas with a good cover of Sphagnum moss but will also grow on bare ground or amongst sedges and grasses. It flowers between June and September in the British Isles.

Reproduction and growth 
The flowers are pollinated by small flies. The plant reproduces with seeds or by means of bulbils, small buds which drop off and develop into new plants. The orchid has no true roots and is dependent on fungi in its rhizome to obtain nutrients. The bulbils do not carry fungi from the mother plant and must be infected by the fungi of the right species in the soil in order to develop into a new plant. The rhizome grows vertically in the soil and each year a new pseudobulb develops at the top.

Status and conservation 
Hammarbya paludosa is declining across Europe because of habitat loss. It is classed as Nationally Scarce in Britain where it has disappeared from 61% of its former range. It is considered to be Endangered in Wales as several colonies have been lost recently. It has been lost from 66% of its range in Ireland and is a protected species in both Northern Ireland and the Republic of Ireland. It is generally rare in North America where it was not discovered until 1905. In Minnesota it is considered to be endangered. with three know populations, occurring in conifer swamps growing in association with Thuja occidentalis, Picea mariana, and Larix laricina, but unlike most swamps of the state it grows in those that receive water from up-welling of ground water that have moderate levels of dissolve minerals and a neutral pH.

Many bogs and wet heaths have been reclaimed for agriculture. At some sites lack of grazing has led to a reduction in the open habitat that it needs while at other sites the habitat has been degraded by overgrazing. Many remaining colonies are small.

References

External links 

  Den virtuella floran - Distribution
 Flora of Northern Ireland: Hammarbya paludosa
 Online Atlas of the British & Irish Flora
 Fancy Plants, Bog Orchid (Hammarbya)
 Red Data Book of Bulgaria, Hammarbya paludosa 
 Flickr photo, Geoff Campbell Photography, Bog Orchid (Hammarbya paludosa) in Antrim Hills of Northern Ireland
 AHO Bayern, Sumpf-Weichwurz, Hammarbya paludosa 
 North American Orchid Conservation, Bog adder's-mouth, Malaxis paludosa
 E-Flora BC, Electronic Atlas of the Flora of British Columbia,  Malaxis paludosa (L.) Sw., bog adder's-mouth orchid
 Minnesota Wildflowers, Malaxis paludosa (Bog Adder's-mouth)
 

Monotypic Epidendroideae genera
Malaxideae genera
Orchids of Europe
Orchids of Asia
Orchids of North America
Malaxidinae